Sidi Naâmane District is a district of Médéa Province, Algeria.

The district is further divided into 3 municipalities:
Sidi Naamane
Khams Djouamaa
Bouchrahil

Districts of Médéa Province